Unión Deportiva Paiosaco Hierros Añón (UD Paiosaco) is a Spanish football team located in A Laracha in the province of A Coruña, in the autonomous community of Galicia. Founded in 1961 it currently plays in Tercera División – Group 1, holding home matches at Campo Porta Santa with a capacity of 2,000 spectators.

History 
UD Paiosaco was founded in 1961.

Season to season

2 seasons in Tercera Division

References

External links 

 La entidad premiará con insignias de oro y plata a doce personas

Association football clubs established in 1961
Football clubs in Galicia (Spain)
1961 establishments in Spain
Divisiones Regionales de Fútbol clubs